Events from the year 1896 in Canada.

Incumbents

Crown 
 Monarch – Victoria

Federal government 
 Governor General – John Hamilton-Gordon 
 Prime Minister – Mackenzie Bowell (until April 27) then Charles Tupper (May 1 to July 8) then Wilfrid Laurier (from July 11)
 Chief Justice – Samuel Henry Strong (Ontario)
 Parliament – 7th (until 24 April) then 8th (from 19 August)

Provincial governments

Lieutenant governors 
Lieutenant Governor of British Columbia – Edgar Dewdney 
Lieutenant Governor of Manitoba – James Colebrooke Patterson
Lieutenant Governor of New Brunswick – John James Fraser (until November 24) then Jabez Bunting Snowball (from December 9)
Lieutenant Governor of Nova Scotia – Malachy Bowes Daly   
Lieutenant Governor of Ontario – George Airey Kirkpatrick (until November 7) then Casimir Gzowski  
Lieutenant Governor of Prince Edward Island – George William Howlan
Lieutenant Governor of Quebec – Joseph-Adolphe Chapleau

Premiers 
Premier of British Columbia – John Herbert Turner 
Premier of Manitoba – Thomas Greenway 
Premier of New Brunswick – Andrew George Blair (until July 17) then James Mitchell 
Premier of Nova Scotia – William Stevens Fielding (until July 18) then George Henry Murray (from July 20)
Premier of Ontario – Oliver Mowat (until July 25) then Arthur Sturgis Hardy
Premier of Prince Edward Island – Frederick Peters 
Premier of Quebec – Louis-Olivier Taillon (until May 11) then Edmund James Flynn

Territorial governments

Lieutenant governors 
 Lieutenant Governor of Keewatin – James Colebrooke Patterson
 Lieutenant Governor of the North-West Territories – Charles Herbert Mackintosh

Premiers 
 Chairman of the Executive Committee of the North-West Territories – Frederick Haultain

Events
April 27 – Sir Mackenzie Bowell resigns as Prime Minister due to cabinet infighting. He is replaced by Sir Charles Tupper.
May 1 – Sir Charles Tupper becomes prime minister, replacing Sir Mackenzie Bowell
May 11 – Edmund Flynn becomes Premier of Quebec, replacing Sir Louis-Olivier Taillon
May 26 – A bridge collapse in Victoria, British Columbia kills 55 people
June 23 – Federal election: Wilfrid Laurier's Liberals win a majority, defeating Sir Charles Tupper's Conservatives. One of the key issues in the campaign has been the Manitoba Schools Question
July 11 – Wilfrid Laurier becomes prime minister, replacing Sir Charles Tupper
July 20 – George Henry Murray becomes premier of Nova Scotia, replacing William Fielding
July 25 – Arthur S. Hardy becomes premier of Ontario, replacing Sir Oliver Mowat
July – James Mitchell becomes premier of New Brunswick, replacing Andrew Blair
August 17 – Gold is discovered in the Yukon, prompting the Klondike gold rush

Full date unknown
A plan to populate the western prairies with immigration from eastern Europe is unveiled
The first Canadian blast furnace opens in Hamilton, Ontario

Sport 

February 14 – Winnipeg Victorias win their first Stanley Cup by defeating Montreal Victorias 2 goals to 0 at Montreal's Victoria Skating Rink

Births

January to June
March 8 – Charlotte Whitton, feminist, politician and mayor of Ottawa (d.1975)
March 16 – Harry Banks, soldier
March 21 – Errick Willis, politician (d.1967)
April 11 – Léo-Paul Desrosiers, journalist, writer (d.1967)
April 20 – Wilfrid R. "Wop" May, World War I flying ace and pioneering bush pilot (d.1952)
May 2 – Elmore Philpott, journalist and politician (d.1964)
May 18 – Brock Chisholm, doctor and first Director-General of the World Health Organization (d.1971)
June 22 – Leonard W. Murray, naval officer (d.1971)

July to December

July 2 – Prudence Heward, painter (d.1947)
July 4 – Frederick Cronyn Betts, politician (d.1938)
July 10 – Thérèse Casgrain, feminist, reformer, politician and Senator (d.1981)
July 27 – Anne Savage, painter and art teacher (d.1971)
August 12 – Mitchell Hepburn, politician and 11th Premier of Ontario (d.1953)
August 18 – Jack Pickford, actor (d.1933)
August 30 – Raymond Massey, actor (d.1983)
August 31 – Alice Strike, Canada's last surviving female World War I veteran (d.2004)
November 3 – Madeleine Fritz, paleontologist
November 7 – Henry Botterell, World War I fighter pilot (d.2003)

Deaths
January 14 – Christopher William Bunting, politician, merchant, newspaper owner and newspaper publisher (b.1837)
February 20 – Hart Massey, businessman and philanthropist (b.1823)
April 13 – John Christian Schultz, politician and Lieutenant-Governor of Manitoba (b.1840)
May 4 – Timothy Anglin, politician and Speaker of the House of Commons of Canada (b.1822)
June 7 – Wyatt Eaton, painter (b.1849)
June 10 – Donald Alexander Macdonald, politician (b.1817) 
June 19 – John Beverley Robinson, politician (b.1821) 
June 25 – Samuel Leonard Tilley, Premier of New Brunswick (b. 1818)
November 24 – John James Fraser, lawyer, judge, politician and 4th Premier of New Brunswick (b.1829)
 Anne Hill, dancer and actor (b. 1804)

Historical documents

 Summary of Canada's imperial history and description of Governor General's Historical Ball

 Joshua Slocum sails Cape Horn solo on his globe-circling voyage

 Visitor describes constant boat traffic on the Muskoka Lakes, Ontario

References
  

 
Years of the 19th century in Canada
Canada
1896 in North America